The IRL Women's World Rankings are the ranking system for women's national teams in the sport of rugby league football.

See also

International Rugby League
RLIF Awards
IRL Wheelchair World Rankings

References 

Rugby league trophies and awards
Sports world rankings